is a Japanese judoka, Olympic medalist and world champion.

He is from Kōriyama, Fukushima. After graduation from Nihon University, He belonged to Tokyo Metropolitan Police Department.

He received a bronze medal in the heavyweight class at the 1976 Summer Olympics in Montreal. He is world champion from 1975 and from 1979.

As of 2008, He coaches judo at North Asia University in Akita, Japan. He is also one of the 'Frontier Ambassadors' of his hometown Koriyama City.

References

External links
 

1950 births
Living people
Japanese male judoka
Olympic judoka of Japan
Judoka at the 1976 Summer Olympics
Olympic bronze medalists for Japan
Nihon University alumni
Olympic medalists in judo
People from Kōriyama
Medalists at the 1976 Summer Olympics
20th-century Japanese people